11 Maruti or God Hanuman temples were established by Samarth Ramdas in Maharashtra, India in the 17th century,
. The objective behind establishing these temples was to create awareness of fitness among the youth of Maharashtra so that they could participate in establishing the Maratha Empire started by Shivaji.

These temples are located at the following locations

 Shahapur, near Karad (Established in 1644)
 Masur (Established in 1645)
 Chaphal Vir Maruti Temple, near Satara (Established in 1648)
 Chaphal Das Maruti Temple, near Satara (Established in 1648)
 Shinganwadi, near Satara (Established in 1649)
 Umbraj, near Masur (Established in 1649)
 Majgaon, near Satara (Established in 1649)
 Bahe, near Sangli (Established in 1651)
 Manapadale, near Kolhapur (Established in 1651)
 Pargaon, near Panhala (Established in 1651)
 Shirala (Established in 1654)

All the idols are originals from the 17th century whereas the temples have been renovated. Unfortunately some of the temples are in a dilapidated state, access is not easy and some even seem derelict. This important work of Swami Ramdas needs attention from the administrators. The site can be visited from Pune/Mumbai in 2 days or in one day from Sangli, Satara, Kolhapur.

References

Buildings and structures in Maharashtra
Hindu temples in Maharashtra
Hanuman temples
1644 establishments in Asia